Declana glacialis is a species of moth in the family Geometridae. It is endemic to New Zealand.

References

Moths of New Zealand
Moths described in 1898
Endemic fauna of New Zealand
Ennominae
Taxa named by George Hudson
Endemic moths of New Zealand